The Oakland Presbyterian Church in Oakland, Tennessee is a historic church built during 1889–91.  It was listed on the National Register of Historic Places in 2002.

It is a one-story weatherboard-clad building.  In 1954 a one-story gable roof weatherboard addition was built at the rear.  It is located at 14780 Tennessee Highway 194 South in Oakland, Tennessee.

References

Presbyterian churches in Tennessee
Churches on the National Register of Historic Places in Tennessee
Gothic Revival church buildings in Tennessee
Buildings and structures in Fayette County, Tennessee
National Register of Historic Places in Fayette County, Tennessee